Cyllarus (Ancient Greek: Κύλλαρος) was a centaur in Greek mythology.

Mythology 
The below is mentioned in Ovid's Metamorphoses,

He was handsome and valiant, and dearly loved his centaur wife Hylonome. He participated in the battle against the Lapiths and was fatally wounded by a spear. His assailant was unknown. He died in the arms of his beloved wife, who then joined him by impaling herself on the same spear.

See also
List of Greek mythological figures

Note

Centaurs
Metamorphoses characters

Reference 

 Publius Ovidius Naso, Metamorphoses translated by Brookes More (1859-1942). Boston, Cornhill Publishing Co. 1922. Online version at the Perseus Digital Library.
 Publius Ovidius Naso, Metamorphoses. Hugo Magnus. Gotha (Germany). Friedr. Andr. Perthes. 1892. Latin text available at the Perseus Digital Library.

Characters in Greek mythology